This is a list of cemeteries (or graveyards) in Pakistan.

Graveyards

Gilgit-Baltistan 
 Old British Cemetery, Gilgit

Islamabad Capital Territory 
 CDA Graveyard, Burma Town
 DHA II Graveyard, Jinnah Boulevard
 H-8 Graveyard
 Islamabad Graveyard H-11

Khyber Pakhtunkhwa

Abbottabad 
 Old Christian Cemetery

Peshawar 
Arif Town Graveyard, Shakarpura
Graveyard, University of Peshawar, Rahat Abad
Old Christian Cemetery
Pajagi Graveyard, Pajagi

Punjab

Gujranwala 
Graveyard Model Town, Model Town

Lahore 
 G Block Graveyard,175G Model Town Link Road, Block G Block Q Model Town
 Gora Cemetery
 Gora Kabristan, Dharampura, Saddar Town
 Miani Sahib Graveyard
 Mominpura Graveyard
Qabristan Shahi Badshahi Bijli Mohallah

Rawalpindi 
 Pir Wadhai Graveyard

Sialkot 
Abbot Road Graveyard
Baba Shah Jamal Qabristan, Mohala Powaar Pura
Canal City Cemetery, Canal City, Ugoki Road
Christian Cemetery, Maryam Town, Chhabilpur
Christian Graveyard, Christian Town, Sialkot
Imam Ali-ul-Haq, Imam Sahab
Masjid Bilal Cemetery, Model Town
Murshadabad Qabristan, Harrar
Muslim Colony Qabristan, Christian Town
Peer Abdul Shah Qabristan. Chabilpur, Nagaur
Peer Shahwali Qabristan, Kashmir Colony, Chhabilpur
Qabristan Sayedan, Kharotain Sayedan, Sialkot
Qabrustan Shaheedan
Shahmonga Wali Cemetery
St. John Christian Graveyard, Chabilpur, Maryam Town

Sindh

Karachi 
 Bani Israel Graveyard
 Gora Cemetery
Karachi War Cemetery

Mausolea

Necropoleis

Chaukhandi tombs, Karachi
Chitorri, Mirpur Khas
Makli Hill, Thatta
Mohammadabad, Dadu
Mohenjo-daro, Larkana
Nausherwani tombs, Kharan

See also
List of cemeteries
List of cemeteries in Karachi

References